Enric Roig Masriera (Barcelona, 1892 - ibid, 17 December 1962) was a violinist , poet and  musicologist .

Training 

He was one of the Masrieras, a renowned family of artists of modernism  (Lluís Masriera i Rosés, Josep Masriera i Manovens, Francesc Masriera i Manovens) present in various fields of culture. He was educated at  Liceu Conservatory. Its cultural and artistic training was influenced mainly by the family. He worked closely with his family playing music and plays in the workshop Estudi Masriera/Petit teatre at Bailen street under the name of  Lluís Masriera/Companyia Belluguet. He grew up and was formed artistically and culturally in this environment .

Musicologist 

His main achievement was to have extended the field of music research, both to the Preclassic and into the modern past . In an atmosphere of inertia and scarcity, he defended the work and the theory of Arnold Schoenberg and his followers, including his friend  Robert Gerhard i Ottenwaelder. Among his pupils there were renowned musicians such as Manuel Garcia Morante, Enric Gispert, Joan Guinjoan and Joaquim Homs Oller to whom, despite not being his pupil, he transmitted a large direct descent. He is the author of the following essays :  The XVIth  century Italian violinists The value of contemporary music , The creators of the classic opera in Naples,  The sacred classical polyphony Songs of the troubadours, remarks on the interpretation of classical works for violin, and articles in several magazines.

He was a member of several associations and movements around the contemporary music as  Discòfils - Associació Pro- Música   a pioneering movement in Spain which was active between March 1935 and February 1936, ten years after the birth of the electric recordings, with a clear educational vision of the citizens of his country. This association was encouraged by Joan Prats and Ricard Gomis and had the advice of the Catalan composer Robert Gerhard  and the technical assessment of the violinist Enric Roig. These sessions also involved the eminent musicologist Father Higini EAnglès i Pàmies the reviewer Josep Palau i Claveras, the folklorist and Mallorquin composer Baltasar Samper i Marquès and the music critic from Madrid Adolfo Salazar. Part of Enric Roig's legacy as a music teacher is in the Universitat Pompeu Fabra's Library  and his recordings collection were given to the National Library of Catalonia.

References

External links
 Fons Enric Roig. Personal recordings collection of Enric Roig i Masriera in the National Library of Catalonia

1892 births
1962 deaths
Poets from Catalonia
Classical musicians from Catalonia
20th-century Spanish poets
20th-century Spanish musicians
Spanish male poets
20th-century Spanish male writers
Spanish classical violinists
20th-century classical violinists
20th-century Spanish male musicians
Writers from Barcelona
Musicians from Barcelona
Spanish musicologists
20th-century musicologists
Male classical violinists